Asari Station is a railway station on the Torņakalns – Tukums II Railway in the Asari neighbourhood of Jūrmala, Latvia.

References

External links 

Railway stations in Latvia
Railway stations in the Russian Empire opened in 1877